Attachiamenta bonorum, in ancient law books, denotes an attachment of chattels to recover a personal debt or estate.

References

Legal history